is a Japanese television jidaigeki or period drama that was broadcast in prime-time in 1976. It is 8th in the Hissatsu series.

Plot

Cast
Ken Ogata as Tokiya Yumejirō
Isuzu Yamada as Hananoya
Gannosuke Ashiya as Tobei
Kanppie Hazama as Heromatsu
Judy Ongg as Tombo
Kensaku Morita as Shikake no Tenppie

References

1976 Japanese television series debuts
1970s drama television series
Jidaigeki television series